Hazi Aslanov
 Həzi Aslanov, Azerbaijan
 Hazi Aslanov (Baku Metro)